Youth Service America, or YSA, is a resource center that partners with thousands of organizations committed to increasing the quality and quantity of volunteer opportunities for young people, ages 5-25, to serve locally, nationally, and globally. YSA has a reputation for supporting and promoting youth voice, youth service, and service-learning through advocacy, resource sharing, and handing out over $1 million in grants. Steve Culbertson was appointed the President & CEO in 1996.

History
Founded in 1986 with support from the Ford Foundation, YSA’s mission is to expand the impact of the youth service movement with families, communities, schools, corporations, and governments.  Founded and led by Roger Landrum and Frank Slobig for its first 10 years, YSA organized the youth service movement that led to the National and Community Service Acts of 1990 and 1993.  YSA pioneered National Youth Service Day, New Generation Training Program, Working Group on National Youth Service Policy, National Service Leadership Seminar, Prudential Youth Leadership Institute, Fund for Social Entrepreneurs, and National Service SuperConference.

Programs
Programs include:

Technology: YSA.org to support the organization's outreach to partners; and GYSD.org to support Global Youth Service Day;
Microfinance grants that use a teaching application process to encourage hundreds of high quality, measurable, service-learning projects by young people around the world;
Government relations to encourage an ongoing Federal and State investment in national service programs such as AmeriCorps;
Youth Voice initiative to help young people influence adults and contribute to policies and problems that affect them;
Communications to spread the word to media about young people as assets and resources.

YSA has also been a long-time partner supporting the National Service Learning Conference, co-sponsored by the National Youth Leadership Council.

See also
One World Youth Project
Youth service
National service
Community service
National Service Learning Conference
Service-learning
Youth activism
Civic engagement
Steve Culbertson
List of awards for volunteerism and community service

References

External links
Youth Service America website
Global Youth Service Day website

Non-profit organizations based in Washington, D.C.
Youth organizations based in Washington, D.C.
Youth empowerment organizations
Children's charities based in the United States
Social networks for social change
Youth-led organizations
Organizations established in 1986